Cavallina storna (i.e. "Dappled Mare") is a 1953 Italian historical melodrama film  directed by Giulio Morelli and starring Gino Cervi. It is loosely based on some autobiographical poems ("La cavalla storna", "X agosto", "Un ricordo", and "II nido di Farlotti") by Giovanni Pascoli.  It grossed about 145 million  lire at the Italian box office.

Plot  
An engineer accompanies Mariù Pascoli from Bologna to San Mauro, a young woman he had been with for some time. During the journey they get engaged, but the spell is interrupted by the revelation that the young man makes to the girl: he is the son of a captain accused of being responsible for the death of Ruggero Pascoli, Mariù's father.

Ruggero, many years back, was an administrator of the estate of a prince and the captain was employed by him: discovered an embezzlement of the latter, he ran to report him. In the evening, while he was returning home with the gig and holding two dolls to give as gifts to the two girls, someone shot him treacherously; that someone, according to the police, was the captain. The girl's gaze becomes dark and she suddenly pushes him away asking him never to look for her again. Once back home, she is greeted by her aunt who, to distract her, proposes an engagement to a young man from the village who had been waiting for that moment for some time. On the other hand, the engineer, when he returns to his father's house, finds Adalgisa, the attractive housekeeper, engaged in flirting with a mature boy. He does not know that that affair was artfully concocted to hide the truth: Dalgisa is actually the captain's lover and that the latter was really Ruggero's killer, and Dalgisa had lied during the interrogation to the police to make sure that the crime remained without guilty.

Sandro continually searches for Mariù to try to understand the reason for his refusal, even his father remains vague and only Matilda, the girl's aunt, exasperated by his insistence, reveals to him that the family and the whole town consider Baroni the killer of Ruggero despite not having no evidence.

Meanwhile, Baroni is preparing to escape with his son and quarrels with Dalgisa who feels betrayed by the man for whom she lied and from whom she got nothing in return.

Sandro and Mariù meet again, while the girl cannot forget the suffering experienced by the family, the boy convinced of his father's innocence accuses her of having instilled in him the doubt right now that he is about to be recognized and acquire his surname. The boy would be willing to forget everything and marry Mariù, after all if the father was really guilty there would be a sign.

Suddenly they hear screams, Baroni's stable has caught fire and in an attempt to save the animals Baroni is blocked by Dalgisa, responsible for the fire and they both die. When the attendant shouts "the hand of God" the young people realize the truth and separate, this time forever.

Cast 
Gino Cervi as  Ruggero Pascoli 
Franca Marzi as  Dalgisa 
Cesare Danova as Sandro Fabbri 
Monica Clay as  Mariù Pascoli
Paola Barbara as    Matelda Pascoli 
Umberto Sacripante as  Baganin
Emma Baron as  Caterina Pascoli  
Clelia Matania as  Erminia
Oscar Andriani as The Intendant
Michele Riccardini as  Francesco
Carlo Ninchi as  Cpt. Baroni

References

External links

Cavallina storna at Variety Distribution

1953 drama films
1953 films
Italian historical drama films
Films with screenplays by Cesare Zavattini
Italian black-and-white films
Melodrama films
1950s Italian films
1950s historical drama films
1950s Italian-language films